Cape Kidnappers Golf Course is an 18-hole course near Te Awanga, Hawkes Bay, New Zealand. It takes its name from the nearby headland of Cape Kidnappers.  It was designed by Tom Doak in 2004 and was funded by American developer Julian Robertson.
In 2007, Golf Digest magazine rated Cape Kidnappers the 10th best course outside of the United States.

References

Golf clubs and courses in New Zealand
Sport in the Hawke's Bay Region

External links